Experimental is a British factual television series produced by NERD and aired on Channel 4 in 2015. The show, created and presented by Tim Shaw and featuring Buddy Munro, attempts to recreated various viral videos in an effort to prove their validity.

Series Produced and Directed by Stephen Shearman.

Experiments 
The show features a variety of experiments including:
 Can you play tennis on the wings of an aircraft?
 Can you lift a person off the ground with fire hoses?
 Can you scale a wall with only vacuum cleaners?

Episodes

References

2015 British television series debuts
2015 British television series endings
Channel 4 original programming
British television documentaries
English-language television shows